American singer, songwriter, record producer, and composer Finneas O'Connell has released one studio album, two soundtracks, one extended play and 25 singles (including three as a featured artist). The singer began his career after he wrote and produced Billie Eilish's song "Ocean Eyes". Finneas and Eilish uploaded "Ocean Eyes" to SoundCloud in November 2015, and it became an instant hit. 

Finneas' debut EP Blood Harmony, peaked at number 14 on the US Heatseekers Album chart, while its lead single "Let's Fall in Love for the Night", peaked at number 17 and 24 on the US Billboard Alternative Songs and Rock Airplay charts, respectively. It has also received a gold certification by Music Canada (MC), which denotes track-equivalent sales of forty-thousand units based on sales and streams. His single "What They'll Say About Us" peaked at number 35 on the US Billboard Hot Rock & Alternative Songs chart.

Studio albums

Soundtrack albums

EPs

Singles

As lead artist

As featured artist

Guest appearances

Music videos

Appearances

Songwriting and production credits

Notes

References

Discographies of American artists
Pop music discographies
discography